The Cartier Champion Two-year-old Colt is an award in European horse racing, founded in 1991, and sponsored by Cartier SA as part of the Cartier Racing Awards. The award winner is decided by points earned in group races plus the votes cast by British racing journalists and readers of the Racing Post and The Daily Telegraph newspapers.

Records
Leading trainer (12 wins):
 Aidan O'Brien – Fasliyev (1999), Johannesburg (2001), Hold That Tiger (2002), One Cool Cat (2003), George Washington (2005), Mastercraftsman (2008), St Nicholas Abbey (2009), Gleneagles (2014), Air Force Blue (2015), Churchill (2016), U S Navy Flag (2017), Van Gogh (2020)

Leading owner (12 wins):
 Michael Tabor – Fasliyev (1999), Johannesburg (2001), Hold That Tiger (2002), One Cool Cat (2003), George Washington (2005), Mastercraftsman (2008), St Nicholas Abbey (2009), Gleneagles (2014), Air Force Blue (2015), Churchill (2016), U S Navy Flag (2017), Van Gogh (2020)
 Sue Magnier – Fasliyev (1999), Johannesburg (2001), Hold That Tiger (2002), One Cool Cat (2003), George Washington (2005), Mastercraftsman (2008), St Nicholas Abbey (2009), Gleneagles (2014), Air Force Blue (2015), Churchill (2016), U S Navy Flag (2017), Van Gogh (2020)

Winners

 Two awards were given in 1996. Revoque was named Champion Two-year-old; Bahamian Bounty was named Champion Two-year-old Colt.

References

Horse racing awards